Squads of the 2005 FIFA Confederations Cup played in Germany. Players in Groups A and B are listed below. Nations in Group A and B include: Argentina, Australia, Germany, Tunisia, Brazil, Greece, Japan, Mexico.

Group A

Argentina
Head coach:  José Pékerman

Australia
Head coach:  Frank Farina

Germany
Head coach:  Jürgen Klinsmann

Tunisia
Head coach:  Roger Lemerre

Group B

Brazil
Head coach: Carlos Alberto Parreira

Greece
Head coach:  Otto Rehhagel

Japan
Head coach:  Zico

Mexico
Head coach:  Ricardo La Volpe

Player statistics
Player representation by club nationality

* Nations in italics are not represented by their national teams in the tournament.

External links
2005 FIFA Confederations Cup squads - FIFA.com
 

FIFA Confederations Cup squads
Squads